Kadma is a neighbourhood in the city of Jamshedpur, Jharkhand, India. It is a residential area. The area has both the residential quarters of Tata Steel and private residential apartment buildings.

Civic administration
There is a police station at Kadma.

See also 
Sakchi
Bistupur
Sonari
List of neighbourhoods of Jamshedpur

References 

Neighbourhoods in Jamshedpur